Oliveira do Hospital is a municipality in the district of Coimbra, in the central part of continental Portugal. The population in 2011 was 20,855, in an area of 234.52 km².

History

Inhabited by ancient civilizations, Oliveira do Hospital has Roman settlements, Visigothic relics, noble Gothic mansions as well as ancient villages built of slate. One can find Neolithic and Bronze Age burial grounds and genuine religious and rural relics such as the large granite outcroppings used as threshing floors, the Holy Cross Church and the Ferreiros Chapel, a Roman Gothic style temple dating to the 13th century and the Church of Sao Gião, known as the cathedral of its region due to its richly carved and painted 18th century Baroque interior.

Geography
It is located at the northern edge of the district of Coimbra in the foothills of the Serra da Estrela Mountains, bisected by the Alva and Alvoco River valleys. Administratively, the municipality is divided into 16 civil parishes (freguesias):

 Aldeia das Dez
 Alvoco das Várzeas
 Avô
 Bobadela
 Ervedal e Vila Franca da Beira
 Lagares
 Lagos da Beira e Lajeosa
 Lourosa
 Meruge
 Nogueira do Cravo
 Oliveira do Hospital e São Paio de Gramaços
 Penalva de Alva e São Sebastião da Feira
 Santa Ovaia e Vila Pouca da Beira
 São Gião
 Seixo da Beira
 Travanca de Lagos

Economy
Its fertile geographic position favors agriculture, which is the dominant activity of the region with wine and cheeses being important products. Regarding its business sector, confections, machine tools, packaging and toys are the most important. Oliveira do Hospital is known for its natural environment, cuisine, arts and crafts.

Transport
Although Oliveira do Hospital is well within the interior of the country, transportation services are quite adequate and have been increasing as befits a growing region. There are a number of roads to the coast and other cities, the best known being the scenic Estrada da Beira.

The Bridge with Three Entrances (Ponte das Três Entradas), a very rare three-way bridge, crosses the Alva River at Oliveira do Hospital.

Notable people
 Brás Garcia de Mascarenhas (1596 in Avô - 1656 in Avô) soldier, poet and writer.
 Dulce Pássaro (born 1953 in Oliveira do Hospital) an engineer, politician and Govt. Minister, 2009/2011
 Carlos Martins (born 1982 in Oliveira do Hospital) footballer with 327 club caps and 17 for Portugal
 Tomané Nunes (born 1987 in Nogueira do Cravo) a retired footballer with 119 club caps
 João Martins (born 1988  in Oliveira do Hospital) footballer with 199 club caps

References

External links

 Photos from Oliveira do Hospital

 
Cities in Portugal
Populated places in Coimbra District
Municipalities of Coimbra District